Wnt inhibitory factor 1 is a protein that in humans is encoded by the WIF1 gene. WIF1 is a lipid-binding protein that binds to Wnt proteins and prevents them from triggering signalling.

Function 

WNT proteins are extracellular signaling molecules involved in the control of embryonic development. This gene encodes a secreted protein, which binds WNT proteins and inhibits their activities. This protein contains a WNT inhibitory factor (WIF) domain and 5 epidermal growth factor (EGF)-like domains. It may be involved in mesoderm segmentation. This protein is found to be present in fish, amphibia and mammals.

References

Further reading